Gun Margareta Winberg (born Gustafsson 13 August 1947) is a Swedish Social Democratic politician. Winberg held various ministerial posts in the Third cabinet of Ingvar Carlsson and the Cabinet of Göran Persson from 1994 to 2003, and was Deputy Prime Minister of Sweden from 2002 to 2003. She was Minister for Agriculture from 1994 to 1996, and again from 1998 to 2002, Minister for Labour from 1996 to 1998, and, in addition, held the position of Minister for Gender Equality from 1998 to 2003.

She became a very controversial figure in the public debate, after an interview she gave to the Swedish documentary The Gender War in 2005. In the second part of the two-part documentary, Winberg expressed strong support for radical feminism, for the ideologist Eva Lundgren, and for requiring institutes of higher education to teach feminist theory as fact, in order to change society.

Within the Social Democrats, she had a euro-sceptic profile, and was one of two ministers campaigning for the "no" side in the 1994 referendum on Sweden's membership in the European Union. She similarly was against adopting the euro, but as deputy prime minister, she held a low profile in the 2003 referendum on the issue.

From 2003 to 2007, she served as Sweden's ambassador to Brazil.

References

External links
Margareta Winberg at the Riksdag website

|-

|-

|-

|-

|-

1947 births
Ambassadors of Sweden to Brazil
Deputy Prime Ministers of Sweden
Living people
Socialist feminists
Radical feminists
Swedish feminists
Anti-prostitution feminists
Swedish Ministers for Agriculture
Swedish Ministers for Employment
Swedish Ministers for Gender Equality
Members of the Riksdag from the Social Democrats
Women members of the Riksdag
Women government ministers of Sweden
Members of the Riksdag 2002–2006
21st-century Swedish women politicians
Swedish women ambassadors
Swedish Ministers for Nordic Cooperation